is an action-adventure game franchise created by Nintendo. The player controls the bounty hunter Samus Aran, who protects the galaxy from Space Pirates and other malevolent forces and their attempts to harness the power of the parasitic Metroid creatures.

Metroid combines the platforming of Super Mario Bros. and the exploration of The Legend of Zelda with a science fiction setting and an emphasis on nonlinear gameplay. Most Metroid games are side-scrolling, while the 3D games use a first-person perspective. Players battle hostile alien enemies and obtain power-ups as they progress through the game world. The series is known for its isolated atmosphere, featuring few non-player characters.

The first Metroid was developed by Nintendo R&D1 and released on the Nintendo Entertainment System in 1986. Metroid II: Return of Samus was released for the handheld Game Boy in 1991. Super Metroid (1994), released for the Super Nintendo Entertainment System, received acclaim and is considered one of the best games on the console. After a hiatus, Metroid Fusion (2002) and Metroid: Zero Mission (2004) were released for the Game Boy Advance. 

The first 3D Metroid game, Metroid Prime (2002), was developed by Retro Studios for the GameCube and received acclaim. It was followed by Metroid Prime 2: Echoes (2004) and the Wii game Metroid Prime 3: Corruption (2007). Metroid: Other M (2010), developed by Team Ninja for the Wii, received weaker reviews. After another hiatus, MercurySteam developed a new 2D Metroid, Metroid: Samus Returns (2017) for the handheld Nintendo 3DS, followed by Metroid Dread (2021) for the Nintendo Switch.

, the Metroid series had sold over 17.44 million copies. It has been represented in other Nintendo media, including the Super Smash Bros. series. Additional media includes soundtracks, comic books, and manga. Along with the 1997 Konami game Castlevania: Symphony of the Night, the early Metroid games defined the Metroidvania subgenre, inspiring other games with continuous, explorable side-scrolling levels. Samus was one of the first prominent female video game characters.

Gameplay
The Metroid series contains gameplay elements from shooter, platformer, and adventure games. The series is notable for its non-linear progression and solitary exploration format where the player only controls Samus Aran, with few or no other characters to interact with. The player gains items and power-ups for Samus's cybernetic suit primarily through exploration, and occasionally by defeating alien creatures through real-time combat with the suit's arm cannon. Many such upgrades enable further avenues of exploration. A recurring upgrade is the Morph Ball, which allows Samus to curl into a ball, roll into tight places and plant bombs.

The classic series consists of 2D side-scrollers, while the Metroid Prime series uses a first-person perspective, and first-person shooter mechanics. The 2010 title Other M made use of a third person shooter format but this was not carried over into subsequent releases.

The original Metroid was influenced by two other major Nintendo franchises: Mario, from which it borrowed extensive areas of platform jumping, and The Legend of Zelda, from which it borrowed non-linear exploration. Metroid differed in its atmosphere of solitude and foreboding. Metroid was also one of the first video games to feature an exploration to the left as well as the right, and backtracking to already explored areas to search for secret items and paths. Since the late 1990s, the term "Metroidvania" has been applied to this format.

Audio
The Metroid series has been noted and praised for its unique style of video game music. Hirokazu "Hip" Tanaka, composer of the original Metroid, has said he wanted to make a score that made players feel like they were encountering a "living creature" and had no distinction between music and sound effects. The only time the main Metroid theme was heard was after Mother Brain is defeated; this is intended to give the player a catharsis. At all other times, no melodies are present in the game. The composer of Super Metroid, Kenji Yamamoto, came up with some of the games' themes by humming them to himself while riding his motorcycle to work. He was asked to compose the music for Metroid Prime to reinforce the series continuity. Metroid Prime'''s Dolby Pro Logic II surround sound was mixed by a member of Dolby.

Developers from Retro Studios noted how the 6 MB memory budget for all sound effects of a level in Metroid Prime was crucial in producing a quality soundtrack, as each sound had to be of high quality to be included. Yamamoto used heavy drums, piano, voiced chants, clangs of pipes, and electric guitar. Metroid Prime 3: Corruption took advantage of the increased RAM in the Wii, allowing for higher-quality audio samples. Kenji Yamamoto, who composed the music for Super Metroid and the Prime trilogy, copied the musical design of the original Metroid in Metroid Prime 3, by keeping the music and themes dark and scary until the very end, when uplifting music is played during the credits.

Plot
Setting
The Metroid franchise takes place in a science fiction setting where humanity is shown to be a part of a spacefaring sovereignty known as the Galactic Federation. Other races are both a part of the Federation as well as close allies, the most prolific being the Chozo, an avian species possessing advanced technology and skills in bioengineering. The mutual nemesis of the Federation and the Chozo are the Space Pirates, a villainous interstellar cabal comprising multiple alien races of disreputable nature that all refuse to abide to the Galactic Federation's rule. They are led by the dragon-like warlord Ridley, and plot to develop weapons of mass destruction from hazardous life forms and materials to destroy the Federation and secure galactic dominance.

The eponymous Metroids are a species of predatory, jellyfish-like organisms that feed on an undetectable life energy found in all living creatures. Biological weapons, the Metroids were engineered by the Chozo to eradicate a parasitic, shapeshifting alien race known as the "X" that threatened their civilization. While the Metroids succeeded in stopping the X, they became a danger to the Chozo themselves when they developed the ability to evolve into different and far deadlier forms. Most of the games center around the efforts of various organizations, including the Space Pirates, the Galactic Federation, and rogue members of the Chozo race, to weaponize the Metroids and the subsequent conflicts they cause.

StoryMetroid follows the adventures of the bounty hunter Samus Aran, who battles the Space Pirates and the Metroids. Samus was raised by the Chozo after her parents were killed by a Space Pirate raid led by Ridley. She serves in the military of the Galactic Federation before departing and beginning work as a bounty hunter, while facing the forces of Ridley and Mother Brain.

In the original Metroid, Samus travels to the planet Zebes to stop the Space Pirates from using the Metroids to create biological weapons. She defeats the cybernetic lifeform Mother Brain, as well as its guardians, Kraid and Ridley.

The Metroid Prime series is set between Metroid and Metroid II. In Metroid Prime, Samus travels to Tallon IV to stop the Space Pirates from exploiting a powerful radioactive substance named Phazon, where she defeats the titular enemy, a Phazon infected Metroid. Metroid Prime: Hunters sees Samus respond to a distress call to the Alimbic Cluster, and fights alongside other bounty hunters against a creature named Gorea. In Metroid Prime 2: Echoes, Samus explores the planet Aether, which has been split into "light" and "dark" dimensions, and battles Dark Samus (the revived Metroid Prime) and the Ing race. In Metroid Prime 3: Corruption, Samus searches for bounty hunters who have been infected with Phazon, while being slowly corrupted by Phazon herself. She eradicates the Phazon and her double. Metroid Prime: Federation Force, the only game in which players do not control Samus, sees Samus mind-controlled by Space Pirates; the Federation Force battles to rescue her and destroy the Space Pirates.

In Metroid II, Samus travels to the Metroid homeworld, SR388, to exterminate the species, but saves a hatchling Metroid that bonds to her and delivers it to the Ceres research station for study. In Super Metroid, Ridley steals the hatchling and takes it to Zebes, where the Space Pirates are attempting to clone the Metroids. Samus is nearly killed by the revived Mother Brain, but is rescued by the now grown Metroid which sacrifices itself and Samus destroys Mother Brain in retaliation. She escapes as Zebes explodes.

In Metroid: Other M, set after Super Metroid, Samus investigates a derelict space station with a Galactic Federation platoon. They team up to stop a clone of Mother Brain created by a Federation group. In Metroid Fusion, Samus has her first encounter with the X parasites after the species reappears on SR388. The X overruns a scientific research station in the planet's orbit, assimilating and imitating many creatures being studied on board. Samus is infected by one but is saved using a vaccine made from the baby Metroid's cells. She discovers that the Federation has been cloning Metroids in secret, and sets the space station on a collision with SR388 to destroy the X parasites. Metroid Dread continues where Fusion left off, with the Federation dispatching a squadron of advanced automatons known as E.M.M.I. to investigate the planet ZDR, where X parasites have been sighted. Samus is sent to the planet herself after contact is lost, coming into conflict with the X and a Chozo war criminal named Raven Beak, stopping both from invading the rest of the galaxy.

Development

 1986: Conception and first game 

The central figures in the production and development of the Metroid series are Satoru Okada, who directed Metroid and created the series; Yoshio Sakamoto, who acted as a character designer for the first game and has directed or supervised the development of most of the subsequent games; Gunpei Yokoi, who headed the R&D1 division and produced the first two games; Makoto Kano, who wrote the scenario for Metroid, co-designed the second game, and produced the third; and Hiroji Kiyotake, who designed characters for the original game.

The original Metroid, an action game for the Family Computer Disk System, was developed by Nintendo's Research and Development 1 (R&D1) and released in Japan on August 6, 1986. It was published for the Nintendo Entertainment System in August 1987 in North America and on January 15, 1988, in Europe. It was directed by Satoru Okada.Metroid was designed to be a shooting game that combined the platform jumping of Super Mario Bros. with the non-linear exploration of The Legend of Zelda and a darker aesthetic. The name of the game is a portmanteau of the words "metro" (as in rapid transit) and android, and was meant to allude to the mainly underground setting of the first game as well as its robot-like protagonist. Halfway through development of the original Metroid, one of the staff said to his fellow developers "Hey, wouldn't that be kind of cool if it turned out that this person inside the suit was a woman?", and the idea was accepted. Ridley Scott's 1979 science-fiction horror film Alien was described by Sakamoto as a "huge influence" after the world of the first Metroid had been created. In recognition of this, an antagonist was given the name Ridley, after director Ridley Scott. The development staff were also influenced by the work of the film's creature designer H. R. Giger, finding his style to be fitting for the Metroid universe.

 1991–2002: Sequels and first hiatus Metroid II: Return of Samus was released for the Game Boy in 1991 in North America and in 1992 in Japan. Metroid II also further established Samus' visual design, with the bulky Varia Suit upgrade and different arm cannons.

As R&D1 were committed to making another game, Nintendo brought in Intelligent Systems to develop Super Metroid for the Super Nintendo Entertainment System (SNES). Development began in late 1991. Released in 1994, Super Metroid drastically expanded the Metroid formula, with numerous new power-ups and a richer story. It received acclaim and is considered one of the best SNES games. It was directed by Yoshio Sakamoto, character designer for the first Metroid; Sakamoto has directed or produced most of the 2D Metroid games since.

After the release of Super Metroid, the franchise entered an eight-year hiatus. Nintendo considered developing a Metroid game for the Nintendo 64, but could not generate firm ideas. Sakamoto said: "When I held the N64 controller in my hands I just couldn't imagine how it could be used to move Samus around." An unidentified company declined an offer from Nintendo to develop an Nintendo 64 Metroid, as they were not confident they could create a worthwhile successor to Super Metroid. Samus appeared in the Nintendo 64 fighting game Super Smash Bros. (1999).

 2002–2009: Metroid Prime and Game Boy Advance games 

In 2000, the Nintendo producer Shigeru Miyamoto visited the new Nintendo subsidiary Retro Studios in Austin, Texas. He did not like any of the projects they had in development, but spent time playing Action Adventure, a third-person science-fiction action game with a female protagonist. Miyamoto tasked Retro with developing a Metroid game for the new Nintendo console, the GameCube. The move terminated the Action Adventure project, with the team from that moving on to Metroid. Metroid Prime, the first 3D Metroid game, released in 2002, moved the nonlinear structure of Super Metroid to a first-person perspective; Nintendo stressed that it was not a first-person shooter but a "first-person adventure". Metroid Prime received acclaim. It sold  copies worldwide and was the best-selling Metroid game until Metroid Dread (2021).

In 2002, Nintendo released Metroid Fusion, a 2D game for the Game Boy Advance (GBA). It was developed by R&D1 and written and directed by Sakamoto. Its gameplay is similar to Super Metroid, but with a more mission-based structure that gives more guidance to the player. The team's next GBA project was Zero Mission (2004), a remake of the original Metroid. Both GBA games received acclaim. A Nintendo restructure merged R&D1 with R&D2 in 2003, shortly ahead of the release of Zero Mission. A 2D Metroid game for the Nintendo DS, Metroid Dread, was in development around 2006, but the hardware was not suitable for the project. Dread was ultimately revived in 2021 for the Nintendo Switch.

In 2004, Nintendo also released Metroid Prime 2: Echoes, which sees Samus switching between parallel light and dark worlds and introduced more difficulty. Metroid Prime 3: Corruption, released for the Wii in 2007, added motion controls and has Samus exploring separate planets, with more emphasis on shooting action. The Prime games were rereleased for the Wii in the compilation Metroid Prime: Trilogy.

In 2005, Nintendo released Metroid Prime Pinball, a pinball spin-off for the DS. Metroid Prime Hunters, a multiplayer game developed by Nintendo Software Technology, was released for the DS in 2006.

 2010–2016: Other M and second hiatus 
A new 3D Metroid game, Metroid: Other M, developed with the Japanese studio Team Ninja and directed by Sakamoto, was released for Wii in 2010. It featured a third-person perspective and placed a greater focus on story and action. Other M received weaker reviews, with criticism for its characterization of Samus as timid and emotional and its reduced emphasis on exploration. Polygon described Other M as "such a massive misfire and a flop with fans that it practically killed the series", with the series going on a second hiatus for six years.

A Metroid minigame, "Metroid Blast", appeared in the Wii U game Nintendo Land (2012), which had a mixed reception. Using the Wii U GamePad, the player controls Samus's gunship, while up to four players with Wii Remotes and Nunchuks control Mii characters on foot, wearing Varia Suits. Miyamoto said this reflected his ideas for future Metroid games.

In 2014, a former artist from Next Level Games said that Next Level had built a Metroid prototype for the Nintendo 3DS handheld before Nintendo asked them to develop Luigi's Mansion: Dark Moon instead. In 2016, Nintendo released Metroid Prime: Federation Force, a multiplayer game for the 3DS developed by Next Level. It received criticism for its multiplayer focus and frivolous tone.

 2017–present: Revival 
In June 2017, Nintendo announced Metroid Prime 4 for the Nintendo Switch. While not confirmed by Nintendo, Eurogamer reported that Prime 4 was being developed by Bandai Namco Studios. Unsatisfied with progress on the game, in January 2019 Nintendo restarted the development under Retro Studios, the developer of the previous Metroid Prime games.

A remake of Metroid II, Metroid: Samus Returns, was developed by MercurySteam and released in September 2017. It retained the gameplay of the original and added 3D graphics and gameplay features such as melee combat. MercurySteam's next project was Metroid Dread for the Switch, a realization of the cancelled Nintendo DS project from the late 2000s. Released in October 2021, it had sold more than 2.9 million copies worldwide by May 2022, making it the best-selling Metroid game. 

On February 8, 2023, Nintendo released Metroid Prime Remastered, a high-definition remaster of Metroid Prime for the Switch. The remaster was developed by Retro Studios with assistance from developers including Iron Galaxy Studios.

ReceptionMetroid ranked as the 70th top game (collectively) by Next Generation in 1996 and the 6th in 1999, and as the eighth best game franchise by IGN in 2008. In 2001, Electronic Gaming Monthly named Super Metroid the best game ever. All the Metroid games released by 2005 were included in a Nintendo Power top 200 Nintendo games list, Prime in the IGN top 100, Metroid, Super Metroid, Prime and Echoes in a list by GameFAQs users; Metroid and Super Metroid in Game Informers list; and Prime and Super Metroid in Edges list. The series has influenced games including Castlevania: Symphony of the Night.

Samus Aran was recognized by Guinness World Records as "enduringly popular" and as the "first playable human female character in a mainstream video game", although Toby Masuyo ("Kissy") from Namco's Alien Sector predates her by one year. Ridley was the second-most requested Nintendo character by IGN and number one by the fans to be added as a playable character to the Super Smash Bros. series and Mother Brain is often named among the best video game bosses.

The original Metroid has been described as boosted by its "eerie" music, adding a "sense of mystery and exploration" to the game by making the game "moody and atmospheric". IGN praised the well-timed music that helped add suspense. GameSpot described Super Metroid as better than the original "in literally every conceivable way", Metroid Fusion was noted for its "understated score" which fit the mood of the adventure and its excellent stereo sound effects, making it an uncommonly good Game Boy Advance sound experience. Metroid Prime was considered one of the best games ever made upon its release, winning Game of the Year from various publications and websites. IGN called the aural experience with Metroid Prime 2: Echoes "mesmerizing". Music from Metroid has been frequently re-released as part of "best of" video game music releases. Metroid Primes soundtrack was called the best sound design on the GameCube. The sound effects were also noted for a high degree of accuracy and blending with the soundtrack. On the popular video game music site OverClocked ReMix, Super Metroid is the tenth-most remixed video game, while the first Metroid video game was twenty-fifth.

Sales
Each Metroid game, excluding spin-offs and remakes, has sold more than one million copies. By September 2012, the series had sold over 17.44 million copies worldwide.

Sales of Metroid games in Japan have typically been lower than in the United States. In its debut week in Japan, Metroid Prime 3: Corruption sold 32,388 units, ranking it behind Ryū ga Gotoku Kenzan!, Super Smash Bros. Brawl, Wii Fit, and Gundam Musou Special. Metroid: Other M was the third-bestselling video game in Japan during its week of release with 45,398 copies sold, ranking it behind Wii Party and Monster Hunter Diary: Poka Poka Airu Village. It sold an additional 11,239 copies the following week.

Legacy
Along with the 1997 Konami game Castlevania: Symphony of the Night, the early Metroid games defined a subgenre known as Metroidvania. Tom Happ, developer of the 2015 Metroidvania game Axiom Verge, defined Metroidvania games as side-scrolling adventures with continuous maps, rather than discrete levels, that require the player to collect items and backtrack. Other notable Metroidvania games include Cave Story (2004), Shadow Complex (2009), Ori and the Blind Forest (2014), Hollow Knight (2017), and Chasm (2018). Metroid is therefore among a handful of game series to have genres named after them, along with Dark Souls (Soulslike) and Rogue (Roguelike).

In 2016, AM2R, a fan-made remake of Metroid II was released. Nintendo issued takedown notices to halt its distribution, citing the potential damage to its intellectual property. AM2R was nominated for the Game Awards 2016, but was removed as it had not been cleared by Nintendo for inclusion.

Crossovers

Super Smash Bros. franchise

Samus is a playable character in all five Super Smash Bros. games. Games from Super Smash Bros. Brawl onward also feature Zero Suit Samus, a version of the heroine using the blue form-fitting suit seen in Zero Mission and the Prime series. Ridley makes cameos in Super Smash Bros., where he can be seen flying through the level Zebes, and in Super Smash Bros. Melee both as an unlockable trophy and in the game's opening, where he is fighting Samus at Ceres Space Station. In Super Smash Bros. Brawl, Ridley appears as a boss character in both normal and Meta Ridley forms. Due to demand from fans, Ridley was made a playable fighter in Super Smash Bros. Ultimate alongside fellow newcomer Dark Samus. Kraid also appeared in Super Smash Bros. Melee as a stage hazard in Brinstar Depths and unlockable trophy. Various other characters such as Metroids, Mother Brain and Dark Samus appear as either trophies or stickers in the Super Smash Bros. series as well. A number of locations from the Metroid franchise have appeared in Super Smash Bros. games as battle stages.

Other games
Samus has appeared in other Nintendo games such as Super Mario RPG, the NES version of Tetris, Tetris DS, Galactic Pinball, Kirby Super Star, Kirby's Dream Land 3 and WarioWare.

A Metroid-lookalike enemy, called the Komayto, appears in Kid Icarus for the NES; the characters allude to the similarities between the two in Kid Icarus: Uprising. In Dead or Alive: Dimensions, a fighting game developed by Team Ninja for the 3DS, one stage is a replica of the arena in which Samus fights Ridley in Metroid: Other M and features both as non-playable characters; When asked why Samus is not playable in Dimensions, Team Ninja's Yosuke Hayashi stated in an interview that "it would be better to let her focus on her job rather than kicking everyone's butt in [Dead or Alive: Dimensions]". The Wii U launch game Nintendo Land has a minigame based on the series called "Metroid Blast".

A Samus amiibo figure can be used to unlock a Mii costume based on her appearance in Mario Kart 8 and a Samus costume in Super Mario Maker.

In other media

Television
A Metroid animated series was considered for the Super Mario Bros. Power Hour, a cancelled animation block that would have aired in the 1980s. Concept art was produced for the series, which notably featured a male incarnation of Samus. Power Hour never moved forward in the intended format, instead being replaced by The Super Mario Bros. Super Show! which aired in 1989. Mother Brain was the primary villain in the Captain N: The Game Master TV show.

Manga
Comics and manga have been made for various magazines based on Metroid, Super Metroid, Metroid Prime, Metroid Prime 2: Echoes, and Metroid: Zero Mission in both the United States and Japan. Samus Aran and other Metroid characters also featured in the Captain N: The Game Master comic books by Valiant Comics. In Japan, a Metroid manga series was published in Kodansha's Monthly Magazine Z beginning in November 2003, and ran for 16 chapters which were later collected into two Tankōbon volumes. The series chronicled Samus' life up through the events of the original game, and went on to influence the plots of subsequent games in the franchise. Also in Japan, Comic Bom Bom published a three-volume manga starring Samus, 

Proposed film
In 2003, two producers optioned the rights to create a live-action film based on Metroid, but the rights expired. The director John Woo acquired the rights a few years later, and his studio Lion Rock Productions was to produce and release the film before 2006. The writers included David Greenwalt, who had worked on Buffy the Vampire Slayer, Angel and Grimm. According to the producer Brad Froxhoven, the film would have explored Samus' origin story; she would be "an exceptionally talented, but also flawed character who was looking for redemption ... We wanted to see her struggle, to be humbled, and to be forced to rise up against crazy odds. And of course we wanted to see the cool weapons in all of their glory."

According to Foxhoven, Nintendo was protective due to the failure of the 1993 Super Mario Bros. film. Nintendo had no answers to the team's questions about Samus' personal life, relationships, and other personal characteristics, and was uncomfortable with the film team "being the ones to propose those answers". Foxhoven said Nintendo left the discussions appreciating that they needed to develop the franchise further if it were to become a Hollywood film. In 2013, Sakamoto said he could support a film directed by Ryuji Kitaura, the director of the CG scenes in Other M'', if the concept and methodologies were good enough.

Notes

References

External links

 

 
Nintendo franchises
Science fiction video games
Video games adapted into comics
Video games featuring female protagonists
Video game franchises introduced in 1986
Metroidvania games